The Romain Rolland Library, founded in 1827 as the Bibliothèque Publique, is one of the oldest Libraries of India located in the union territory of Puducherry. In the year 1966 when the birth centenary of the Great French Scholar, Romain Rolland who was also a contemporary and a close friend of Mahatma Gandhi was celebrated, the Library was renamed after him and ever since it is known as ‘Romain Rolland Library’.

References

External links 
Romain Rolland Library Photos & Address

Libraries in India
Public libraries in India
1827 establishments in India
Buildings and structures in Puducherry
1827 establishments in the French colonial empire
Libraries established in 1827